Robert Dambrot (born October 19, 1994) is an American soccer player who plays as a defender for Indy Eleven in the USL Championship.

Career

College & Amateur
Dambrot began playing college soccer at the University of Akron in 2013, where he red-shirted his first season before transferring to the University of Pittsburgh in 2017.

During college, Dambrot appeared in the National Premier Soccer League with spells at AFC Cleveland and also following college with Virginia Beach City in 2019.

Professional
On August 9, 2019, Dambrot signed for USL Championship side Loudoun United. He made his professional debut on August 14, starting in a 2-1 loss to Charleston Battery. On January 7, 2020, Loudoun announced that Dambrot would return for the 2020 season.

On January 19, 2022, Dambrot signed with USL Championship club Pittsburgh Riverhounds.

Dambrot joined Indy Eleven on August 2, 2022.

Personal
Robby is the son of college basketball coach Keith Dambrot.

References

External links
Akron bio
Pitt bio
USL bio

1994 births
Living people
American soccer players
Association football defenders
Akron Zips men's soccer players
Pittsburgh Panthers men's soccer players
Loudoun United FC players
Pittsburgh Riverhounds SC players
Indy Eleven players
Soccer players from Ohio
National Premier Soccer League players
USL Championship players
Sportspeople from Akron, Ohio